The Stork Caliph (Hungarian: A Gólyakalifa) is a 1917 Hungarian silent drama film directed by Alexander Korda and starring Gyula Bartos, Oscar Beregi Sr. and Judit Bánky. It was the second film made by Korda for his newly established Corvin Film company. He pulled off what was considered a literary coup by persuading the author Mihály Babits to allow him to film a version of his 1916 novel of the same name.

Cast
 Gyula Bartos   
 Oscar Beregi Sr. 
 Judit Bánky   
 Alajos Mészáros

References

Bibliography
 Kulik, Karol. Alexander Korda: The Man Who Could Work Miracles. Virgin Books, 1990.

External links

1917 films
Hungarian silent films
Hungarian drama films
1910s Hungarian-language films
Films directed by Alexander Korda
Films based on Hungarian novels
Hungarian black-and-white films
Austro-Hungarian films
1917 drama films
Silent drama films